Loizos Loizou (born 18 July 2003) is a Cypriot footballer who plays as a winger for Omonia Nicosia.

Career statistics

Club

International goals
Scores and results list Cyprus' goal tally first.

Honours
Omonia
 Cypriot First Division: 2020–21
 Cypriot Cup: 2021–22
 Cypriot Super Cup: 2021
Individual
Cypriot First Division Young Player of the Year: 2020–21
Cypriot First Division Team of the Year: 2020–21

References

External links

2003 births
Sportspeople from Nicosia
Cypriot footballers
Cyprus youth international footballers
Cyprus international footballers
Living people
Association football wingers
AC Omonia players
Cypriot First Division players